Harold Clark McDonell (19 September 1882 – 23 July 1965) was an English first-class cricketer. McDonell was a right-handed batsman who was a leg break bowler who played as an all-rounder.

Biography
McDonell was educated at Winchester College, where he was in the cricket team.

McDonell made his first-class debut for Surrey against Hampshire in 1901. He did not play for Surrey in 1902, but resumed in 1903 and 1904, with his final first-class match for the county coming against the touring South Africans. McDonell played 13 first-class matches for Surrey, scoring 269 runs at a batting average of 14.15 and a high score of 46. With the ball McDonell took 41 wickets at a bowling average of 21.75, with 2 five wicket hauls and best figures of 7/44 against Gloucestershire in 1904.

McDonell not only played for Surrey during this period, but also Cambridge University, for whom he made his debut for in 1902 against HDG Leveson-Gower's XI. From 1902 to 1905 McDonell represented the University in 31 first-class matches, with his final first-class match for the University coming in the 1905 season against Oxford University. In his 31 matches for the University, McDonell scored 898 runs at a batting average of 16.62, with three half centuries and a high score of 78 against Gloucestershire in 1905. With the ball McDonell took 117 wickets at a bowling average of 20.15, with 8 five wicket hauls, a single ten wicket haul in a match and best figures of 8/83 against Surrey in 1904. McDonell was awarded a Blue in each of the three years from 1903 to 1905.

In 1905 McDonell toured North America with the Marylebone Cricket Club, where he played two matches against the Gentlemen of Philadelphia.

For three years McDonell did not play first-class cricket again; in 1908, he joined Hampshire and made his debut for the county against Worcestershire in the County Championship. McDonell played 78 first-class matches for Hampshire, firstly from 1908 to 1914 until the First World War brought an end to first-class cricket; then from 1919 to 1921, with his final first-class match for Hampshire coming against Warwickshire in the 1921 County Championship. In his 78 first-class matches for the county McDonell scored 1,747 runs at a batting average of 16.17, with 6 half centuries and a high score of 76 against Somerset in 1913. An all-rounder, with the ball McDonell took 263 wickets at a bowling average of 22.43, with 11 five wicket hauls, a single ten wicket haul in a match and best figures of 7/47 against Somerset in 1914. In the field McDonell took 69 catches for Hampshire.

As well as playing first-class matches for those teams already mentioned, McDonell also represented the Gentlemen in Gentlemen v Players fixtures of 1903 and 1914. In addition McDonell played first-class matches for Gentlemen of England, Gentlemen of the South and PF Warner's XI.

In McDonell's overall first-class career he scored 3,005 runs at a batting average of 15.73, with 9 half centuries and a high score of 78. With the ball McDonell took 443 wickets at a bowling average of 21.91, with 22 five wicket hauls, 3 ten wicket hauls in a match and best figures of 8/83. In the field McDonell took a combined total of 124 catches.

From 1910 to 1937, McDonell was Headmaster of Twyford School, a boys' preparatory school three miles south of Winchester. He levelled the ground to make a new football pitch and installed a covered swimming pool (on the site of today’s pool but smaller). In 1923 the Memorial library was opened, still in use today. McDonell disliked anything modern or scientific; he refused to install gas lighting and would only have electricity in certain parts of the school. His austerity caused a decline in numbers to 37 pupils.

In 1938 he married his cousin Muriel Nightingale, née Phillips (1898-1975). She had two children, Elizabeth and Ralph, from her previous marriage.
McDonell died on 23 July 1965 at Onich in the Scottish Highlands.

External links
Harold McDonell at Cricinfo
Harold McDonell at CricketArchive
Matches and detailed statistics for Harold McDonell

1882 births
1965 deaths
People from Wimbledon, London
People from Surrey
People educated at Winchester College
English cricketers
Surrey cricketers
Gentlemen cricketers
Cambridge University cricketers
Marylebone Cricket Club cricketers
Hampshire cricketers
Alumni of the University of Cambridge
Gentlemen of the South cricketers
Gentlemen of England cricketers
P. F. Warner's XI cricketers